Watson Boas (born 1994) is a Papua New Guinean professional rugby league footballer who plays as a  for Sepik Pride Rugby League Football Club in the PNGNRL and for Papua New Guinea at international level.

He previously played for the Doncaster and Featherstone Rovers in the Betfred Championship, PNG Hunters in the Queensland Cup, and represented the Papua New Guinean national team, most notably at the 2017 World Cup and 2021 World Cup .

Background
Boas was born in Madang, Madang, Papua New Guinea.

Playing career
Boas previously played for the Agmark Gurias in the PNGNRL and Royals club in East New Britain Rugby League. He is the younger brother of fellow PNG representative Ase Boas. Since his first cap in 2016, Boas has played many fixtures for the Papua New Guinea national rugby league team.

His natural athletic ability saw him garner interest from English Rugby League One side, Featherstone Rovers. However his big break in England, came through a successful loan spell at Doncaster. Playing a part in their promotion to League One at the conclusion of the 2018–2019 season. Doncaster then signed Boas on a two-year permanent deal. Watson got a three year extension on his contract and will be with the Dons until the end of the 2025 season.

References

External links
 PNG Hunters profile
2017 RLWC profile

1994 births
Living people
Doncaster R.L.F.C. players
Expatriate rugby league players in England
Featherstone Rovers players
Papua New Guinean rugby league players
Papua New Guinea national rugby league team players
Papua New Guinea Hunters players
Papua New Guinean expatriate rugby league players
Papua New Guinean expatriate sportspeople in the United Kingdom
Rabaul Gurias players
Rugby league five-eighths
Rugby league halfbacks
People from Madang Province